Giannis Stathis (born 20 May 1987) is a Greek professional footballer who plays as a right-back.

Club career
Stathis previously played in the Greek Super League while out on loan to Apollon Kalamarias during the 2007–08 season.

Honours
 PAS Giannina
Greek Second Division: 2009
 PAS Giannina
Greek Second Division: 2011

References

1987 births
Living people
Apollon Pontou FC players
Ilisiakos F.C. players
PAS Giannina F.C. players
Panthrakikos F.C. players
OFI Crete F.C. players
Levadiakos F.C. players
Platanias F.C. players
Apollon Smyrnis F.C. players
Association football fullbacks
Footballers from Athens
Greek footballers